Katherine Kiernan Griffith (September 30, 1876 – October 17, 1921), also seen as Catherine Kiernan, was an American character actress on stage and in silent films.

Early life 
Catherine Kiernan was born in San Francisco, the daughter of Irish immigrants Peter Kiernan and Catherine Kiernan.

Career 
Griffith had a career in vaudeville and the musical theatre before moving into film work. Described as a "large, commanding woman", she appeared in dozens of silent films, including Tess of the D'Urbervilles (1913), The Gray Nun of Belgium (1915), The Greater Power (1916), Murdered by Mistake (1916), A Little Princess (1917) with Mary Pickford, In Judgment Of (1918), A Yankee Princess (1919) with Bessie Love, The Woman Thou Gavest Me (1919), The Spite Bride (1919) with Olive Thomas, The Woman Next Door (1919), Pollyanna (1920), again with Mary Pickford, Huckleberry Finn (1920), with her son Gordon Griffith as Tom Sawyer, Mid-Channel (1920), and They Shall Pay (1921).

Personal life 
Kiernan married fellow actor Harry Sutherland Griffith in 1897. They had three children, Gordon, Graham, and Gertrude; her son Gordon became a child actor. Katherine Griffith died suddenly from a stroke in 1921, aged 45 years, at her home in Los Angeles.

References

External links 
 The Little Princess (1917), at Internet Archive
 Pollyanna (1920), at Internet Archive
 Huckleberry Finn (1920), at Internet Archive
 

1876 births
1921 deaths
American stage actresses
American silent film actresses
20th-century American actresses
Actresses from San Francisco
American people of Irish descent